Pinto Valley may refer to:

Pinto Valley (Nevada), basin in the Black Mountains of Clark County, Nevada
Pinto Valley mine, copper mine located in Arizona
Pinto Basin, a part of the Joshua Tree National Park